Mesut Akusta (born 22 February 1964) is a Turkish actor.

Akusta was born in Konya. He finished elementary school there. Upon his father's retirement, the family moved to Ayfon and in 1976 he started secondary school. After his father's death, he moved with his family to Ankara in 1985. After passing the university entrance exam won a place in the school of literature and arts. He started his career by appearing in plays for children. In 1992, he joined the cast of Yeditepe Hadi Çaman Theatre. In 1997, he appeared in an adaptation of Nezihe Araz's play Cahide. He also appeared in a number of musicals, including Fehim Paşa Konağı, Atları da Vurdular and Şerefe Yirminci Yüzyıl.

Akusta made his cinematic debut with Yanlış Saksının Çiçeği. He also pursued a career on television, most notably appearing in a leading role on the 2013 drama series Karagül. He continued his career by taking part in the movies Herşey Çok Güzel Olacak, Eylül Fırtınası, and Filler ve Çimen before appearing in the 2019 drama movie 7. Koğuştaki Mucize, which was critically praised.

Filmography

References

External links
 
 

Living people
1964 births
Turkish male stage actors
Turkish male television actors
Turkish male film actors
People from Konya